Chaw Yadanar (born 29 September 1983) is a  Myanmar Academy Award winning Burmese actress. She won her first Myanmar Academy Award for Best Supporting Actress in 2012 with the film Egg.

Throughout her career, she has acted in over 170 films.

Early life and education 
Thandar Bo was born on 29 September 1983 in Yangon, Myanmar. Her younger sister; Thandar Bo is also an actress. She graduated from Dagon University.

Career

In 2014, she played the leading role in the Burmese big screen film 39 Bite Puu movie with actor Nay Toe, Wai Lu Kyaw, Ye Aung and actress Soe Myat Thuzar, Wutt Hmone Shwe Yi.

2012–2013: Film and recognition
In 2012, Chaw Yadanar won the 2012 Myanmar Academy Award, playing in the movie Egg, alongside Khant Si Thu, Kyaw Ye Aung, Soe Myat Nandar, Soe Myat Thuzar, Thinzar Wint Kyaw, Tun Tun (actor).

Selected filmography

Film

Over 170 films, including

Awards and nominations

Personal life
In 2002, she married Kyaw Lin. They have one son and one daughter.

References

Living people
Burmese film actresses
1987 births
21st-century Burmese actresses